Leah Nugent (born 23 November 1992) is a hurdles runner from Jamaica. She was born in Pennsylvania, USA, with strong family heritage ties to Jamaica, from her father and paternal grandparents. Her father moved to the United States before having Leah. Leah is a University of Kentucky graduate, who also used to be a volunteer Coach as well. Leah notes that it has always been her heart to represent Jamaica, because her father is from there along with her other immediate family.

Leah switched her allegiance from the United States of America to Jamaica in 2016, in which at that point she finished third at the Jamaica National Senior Championships which resulted in her acceptance into the 2016 Summer Olympics. She placed sixth in the 400 metres hurdles event at the 2016 Summer Olympics, setting a personal record.

Progression - Outdoor
Source:

Progression - Indoor 
Source:

International competitions

References

1992 births
Living people
Jamaican female hurdlers
Olympic athletes of Jamaica
Athletes (track and field) at the 2016 Summer Olympics
Athletes (track and field) at the 2020 Summer Olympics